An aurora is a natural light display in the sky on Earth seen predominantly in the high latitudes.

Aurora may also refer to:

Common uses 
 Aurora (mythology), the Roman goddess of dawn
 Aurora (given name), a feminine given name (and list of people with the name)
 Aurora (heraldry), the heraldic display of an aurora
Aurora on Mars, the atmospheric phenomenon on Mars

Places

Brazil 
 Aurora, Ceará
 Aurora, Santa Catarina

Philippines 
 Aurora (province), a province in the Philippines
 Aurora, Isabela
 Aurora, Zamboanga del Sur

Romania 
 Aurora, Cujmir, Mehedinţi County
 Cap Aurora, Mangalia, Constanţa County

United States 
 Aurora, Arkansas
 Aurora, Colorado
 Aurora, Illinois
 Aurora, Indiana
 Aurora, Iowa
 Aurora, Kansas
 Aurora, Kentucky
 Aurora, New Orleans, Louisiana
 Aurora, Maine
 Aurora, Minnesota
 Aurora Township, Steele County, Minnesota
 Aurora, Missouri
 Aurora, Nebraska
 Aurora, Nevada
 Aurora, Cayuga County, New York
 Aurora, Erie County, New York
 Aurora, North Carolina
 Aurora, Ohio
 Aurora, Oregon
 Aurora County, South Dakota
 Aurora, South Dakota
 Aurora, Texas
 Aurora, Utah
 Aurora, West Virginia
 Aurora, Florence County, Wisconsin, a town
 Aurora (community), Florence County, Wisconsin, an unincorporated community
 Aurora, Kenosha County, Wisconsin
 Aurora, Taylor County, Wisconsin
 Aurora, Washington County, Wisconsin
 Aurora, Waushara County, Wisconsin

Other places 
 Aurora, Victoria, Australia
 Aurora, Ontario, Canada
 Aurora (Turin), Italy
 Aurora Cave, New Zealand
 Aurora, Western Cape, South Africa
 Aurora, Suriname
 Aurora Island or Maéwo, Vanuatu
 Aurora Islands, phantom isles (once considered near the Falklands)

Education 
 Aurora University, Illinois, United States
 Aurora College, Northwest Territories, Canada
 Aurora College (Invercargill), New Zealand
 Community College of Aurora, Colorado, United States

Structures 
 Aurora (Spencer, Virginia), a historic home near Spencer, Patrick County, Virginia, United States
 Aurora Apartment Hotel, a historic high-rise building located in San Antonio, Texas, United States
 Aurora Bridge, Seattle, Washington, United States
 Aurora, Dichteren, a windmill in Gelderland, Netherlands
 Aurora Melbourne Central, a skyscraper in Melbourne, Australia
 Aurora Place, a skyscraper in Sydney, Australia
 Aurora Stadium, Launceston, Australia
 Aurora Tower, a skyscraper in Brisbane, Australia
 Aurora Wheel, a Ferris wheel in Kuwana, Mie Prefecture, Japan

Arts and entertainment

Visual arts 
 Aurora (Artemisia Gentileschi), a c1625-1627 painting by Artemisia Gentileschi
 Aurora (Reni), a 1614 Baroque ceiling fresco by Guido Reni
 Aurora (sculpture), a 1992 sculpture by Mark di Suvero

Books 
 Prix Aurora Awards, a Canadian literature award
 Aurora, a novel by Michel Leiris
 Aurora, a novel by David Koepp
 Aurora (novel), a 2015 novel by Kim Stanley Robinson
 Aurora, an airship in the novel Airborn
 Aurora-Verlag, a New York-based German language publisher co-founded in 1944 by Lion Feuchtwanger
 Aurora (comics), a Marvel comics character

Periodicals 
 Aurora (literary journal), a literary journal published from 1821 to 1837
 Aurora (newspaper), an 1899–1957 Swedish publication
 Aurora de Chile, the first periodical in Chilean history
 Philadelphia Aurora, a newspaper published from 1794 to 1824

Film and television 
 Aurora (1984 film), an Italian drama
 Aurora (2006 film), a Ukrainian film
 Aurora (2010 film), a Romanian crime story
 Aurora (2014 film), a Chilean film
 Aurora (2018 Filipino film), a Philippine film
 Aurora (2018 Kyrgyz film), a Kyrgyzstani film
 Aurora (telenovela)
 "Aurora" (Stargate Atlantis), an episode of Stargate Atlantis
 Aurora Community Channel, an Australian TV channel
 Aurora (Disney), the title character from the Disney film Sleeping Beauty
 Princess Aurora, the Sleeping Beauty character in Once Upon a Time

Gaming 
 Aurora Engine, a BioWare game engine
 Sega Aurora, a gaming hardware platform
 Aurora, a gaming PC brand by Alienware
 Aurora, the main protagonist from the role-playing video game Child of Light
 The Aurora, a crashed spaceship in the survival adventure game Subnautica

Music

Works 
 Aurora (opera), a 1908 opera by Ettore Panizza
 Aurora (tone poem), an orchestral tone poem by William Lloyd Webber

Bands and artists 
 Aurora (singer) (born 1996), Norwegian singer-songwriter
 Aurora (Christian band), an American/British girl group
 Aurora (electronic music group), a British group
 Aurora (punk band), a Hungarian group
 Aurora, a German dark wave band later known as Aurora Sutra

Albums 
 Aurora (Angela Chang album), 2004
 Aurora (Antiskeptic album), 2003
 Aurora (Asia album), 1986
 Aurora (Aurora album), 2000
 Aurora (Bada album), 2004
 Aurora (Breaking Benjamin album), 2020
 Aurora (Esmerine album), 2005
 Aurora (Jean-Luc Ponty album), 1976
 Aurora (Nico Touches the Walls album), 2009
 Aurora (Susumu Hirasawa album), 1994
 Aurora (Ben Frost album), 2014
 Aurora (Bea Miller album), 2018
 Aurora, a 2009 album by Avishai Cohen
 Aurora, a 1995 album by Crash Vegas
 Aurora, a 2013 album by Joey Moe
 Aurora, a 2021 album by Humbe

Songs 
 "Aurora" (Foo Fighters song), 1999
 "Aurora" (Lights Action song), 2008
 "Aurora", a song by 36 Crazyfists from Rest Inside the Flames
 "Aurora", a song by The Andrews Sisters
 "Aurora", a song by Björk from Vespertine
 "L'aurora", a song by Eros Ramazzotti from Dove c'è musica
 "Aurora", a song by Gloria Trevi from De Película
 "Aurora", a song by Hans Zimmer 
 "Aurora", a song by Lapush from Someplace Closer to Here
 "Aurora", a song by Susumu Hirasawa from Aurora
 "Aurora 2", a Susumu Hirasawa remix of "Aurora" from Solar Ray
 "Aurora", a song by Vanessa Mae from Storm
 "Aurora", a song by Veruca Salt from Tank Girl

Organizations 
 Aurora (pen manufacturer), an Italian manufacturer
 Aurora Cannabis, a Canadian licensed producer of medical cannabis
 Aurora Energy (disambiguation), various electricity companies
 Aurora Film Corporation, an Indian film production and distribution company
 Aurora Flight Sciences (a.k.a. Aurora), flight research subsidiary of Boeing
 Aurora Health Care, a health care system in Wisconsin, United States
 Aurora Innovation, an American self-driving car company
 Aurora (university network), a network of European universities
 Aurora Plastics Corporation, an American toy and hobby company
 Aurora Productions, Hollywood, an American film production house
 Aurora Publishing (Hungary), a German-Hungarian publishing company
 Aurora Publishing (United States), the American subsidiary of Japanese publisher Ohzora Publishing

Science and technology

Astronomy 
 94 Aurora, an asteroid
 Aurora 7, the second American spacecraft to orbit the Earth
 Aurora Flight Sciences (a.k.a. Aurora), flight research subsidiary of Boeing
 Aurora programme, a human spaceflight programme of the European Space Agency
 Aurora, an albedo feature on Mercury

Biology 
 Aurora (genus), a synonym of a genus of sponges
 Aurora, a synonym of the moth genus Peoria (moth)
 Aurora kinase, an enzyme
 Aurora (grape) or Aurore, a hybrid wine grape variety

Computing 
 Apache Aurora, a Mesos framework for both long-running services and cron jobs
 Aurora (typeface), a serif font
 Mobile OS Aurora, a Russian operating system spun off from Sailfish
 Aurora OS, formerly named Eeebuntu OS, a discontinued Ubuntu-based OS for netbooks
 Aurora (protocol), a communications protocol from Xilinx
 Aurora Generator Test, a 2007 experiment by Idaho National Laboratory
 Aurora HDR, high-dynamic-range software for photography
 Operation Aurora, a 2009 cyber attack
 Aurora, a tablet in the NOVO7 series
 Aurora, a version of the Firefox browser
 AURORA, an entrant in the NIST hash function competition

High performance computing 
 Aurora (supercomputer), a Exascale-class supercomputer at the U.S.-based Argonne National Laboratory under development in the 2010s and 2020s
 Aurora, a supercomputer produced by Eurotech
 NEC SX-Aurora TSUBASA, a vector processing architecture from NEC
 Amazon Aurora, a high-performance database developed by Amazon

Transportation

Aerospace 
 Aurora (aircraft), a rumored American reconnaissance aircraft
 Aurora (airline), a Russian airline
 Aurora D8, an airliner concept currently under development
 Lockheed CP-140 Aurora, a maritime patrol aircraft used by the Royal Canadian Air Force
 Aurora Space Station, a concept for a commercial space station
 Aurora Flight Sciences (a.k.a. Aurora), flight research subsidiary of Boeing

Automobiles 
 Aurora (1957 automobile), an American automobile
 Aurora Solar Car
 Oldsmobile Aurora, a full-size sedan made from 1995 to 2003

Rail 
 Aurora station (disambiguation), stations named Aurora
 Aurora (train), a domestic Trans Europ Express in Italy
 Aurora Winter Train, seasonal passenger service on the Alaska Railroad
 Aurora, a South Devon Railway Comet class locomotive
 Brand name to be applied to the British Rail Class 810

Road 
 Aurora Boulevard, a major thoroughfare in Quezon City and San Juan City, Metro Manila
 Aurora Avenue, Seattle, Washington

Watercraft 
List of ships named Aurora

Sports 
 Aurora Formula One, a motor racing championship
 Aurora F.C., a Guatemalan football club
 Aurora FC (Canada), a Canadian soccer club
 Club Aurora, a Bolivian football club
 FBC Aurora, a Peruvian football club
 Aurora Seriate Calcio, a defunct Italian football club
 Aurora Pro Patria 1919, an Italian football club
 S.P. Aurora, a defunct Sammarinese football club

Other uses 
 Jagjit Singh Aurora (1916–2005), Indian soldier
 Aurora Prize for Awakening Humanity, an international humanitarian award
 Aurora Solar Thermal Power Project, a proposed solar-powered electricity generator in South Australia

See also 

 
 
 La Aurora (disambiguation)
 Aurora Airport (disambiguation)
 Aurora station (disambiguation)
 Aurore (disambiguation)
 Arora (disambiguation)
 Avrora (disambiguation)